The Canadian Journal of Research is a defunct peer-reviewed scientific journal established in 1929 by the National Research Council of Canada. In 1935, it split into 4 subsections, and expanded with another 2 subsections in 1944. In 1951, each subsection formed  their own distinct journal:
Canadian Journal of Research, Section A: Physical Sciences (1935−1950) going on as Canadian Journal of Physics.
Canadian Journal of Research, Section B: Chemical Sciences (1935−1950) going on as Canadian Journal of Chemistry.
Canadian Journal of Research, Section C: Botanical Sciences (1935−1950) going on as Canadian Journal of Botany.
Canadian Journal of Research, Section D: Zoological Sciences (1935−1950) going on as Canadian Journal of Zoology.
Canadian Journal of Research, Section E: Medical Sciences (1944−1950) going on as Canadian Journal of Medical Sciences.
Canadian Journal of Research, Section F: Technology (1944−1950) going on as Canadian Journal of Technology.

External links

Multidisciplinary scientific journals
Publications established in 1929
Publications disestablished in 1950
Canadian Science Publishing academic journals
Academic journals published by governments